is a Japanese manga series written and illustrated by Ayako Noda. It began serialization on the manga website Flat Hero's in January 2019; its individual chapters have been collected into four volumes as of May 2021. A live-action television series adaptation aired from June to August 2022.

Media

Manga
Written and illustrated by Ayako Noda, the series began serialization on the Flat Hero's manga website on January 11, 2019. As of May 2021, four volumes have been released.

In July 2021, Tokyopop announced they licensed the series for English publication.

Volume list

Live-action
In March 2022, it was announced that the manga would be receiving a live-action television series adaptation. The series will be directed by Kazuhiro Nakagawa and scripted by Eriko Yoshida; Yudai Chiba and Kento Nagayama will perform the leads. It aired on various Wowow networks from June 4, 2022, to August 6, 2022.

Reception
As part of Anime News Network's winter 2021 manga preview guide, Rebecca Silverman and Caitlin Moore reviewed the series for the website. Silverman praised the plot as unexpectedly dark. Meanwhile, Moore felt the series had a very unique art style, which she had mixed feelings about. Sarah from Anime UK News also praised the series as intriguing and amusing.

At the 2020 Japan Media Arts Festival, the series won the excellence award in the manga division. In the same year, the series ranked 17th in the Next Manga Award in the web manga category.

References

External links
  
 

2022 Japanese television series debuts
Japanese television dramas based on manga
Japanese webcomics
Josei manga
Slice of life anime and manga
Tokyopop titles
Webcomics in print
Wowow original programming